Benjamin Harrison (August 20, 1833March 13, 1901) was an American lawyer and politician who served as the 23rd president of the United States from 1889 to 1893. He was a member of the Harrison family of Virginia—a grandson of the ninth president, William Henry Harrison, and a great-grandson of Benjamin Harrison V, a Founding Father.

Harrison was born on a farm by the Ohio River and graduated from Miami University in Oxford, Ohio. After moving to Indianapolis, he established himself as a prominent local attorney, Presbyterian church leader, and politician in Indiana. During the American Civil War, he served in the Union Army as a colonel, and was confirmed by the U.S. Senate as a brevet brigadier general of volunteers in 1865. Harrison unsuccessfully ran for governor of Indiana in 1876. The Indiana General Assembly elected Harrison to a six-year term in the Senate, where he served from 1881 to 1887.

A Republican, Harrison was elected to the presidency in 1888, defeating the Democratic incumbent Grover Cleveland in the Electoral College despite losing the popular vote. Hallmarks of Harrison's administration included unprecedented economic legislation, including the McKinley Tariff, which imposed historic protective trade rates, and the Sherman Antitrust Act. Harrison also facilitated the creation of the national forest reserves through an amendment to the Land Revision Act of 1891. During his administration six western states were admitted to the Union. In addition, Harrison substantially strengthened and modernized the U.S. Navy and conducted an active foreign policy, but his proposals to secure federal education funding as well as voting rights enforcement for African Americans were unsuccessful.

Due in large part to surplus revenues from the tariffs, federal spending reached one billion dollars for the first time during his term. The spending issue in part led to the defeat of the Republicans in the 1890 midterm elections. Cleveland defeated Harrison for reelection in 1892, due to the growing unpopularity of high tariffs and high federal spending. He returned to private life and his law practice in Indianapolis. In 1899 he represented Venezuela in its British Guiana boundary dispute with Great Britain. Harrison traveled to the court in Paris as part of the case and after a brief stay returned to Indianapolis. He died at his home in Indianapolis in 1901 of complications from influenza. Many have praised Harrison's commitment to African Americans' voting rights, but scholars and historians generally rank him in the bottom half among U.S. presidents.

Family and education

Harrison was born on August 20, 1833, in North Bend, Ohio, the second of Elizabeth Ramsey (Irwin) and John Scott Harrison's ten children. His ancestors included immigrant Benjamin Harrison, who arrived in Jamestown, Virginia, circa 1630 from England. Harrison was of entirely English ancestry, all of his ancestors having emigrated to America during the early colonial period.

Harrison was a grandson of U.S. President William Henry Harrison and a great-grandson of Benjamin Harrison V, a Virginia planter who signed the Declaration of Independence and succeeded Thomas Nelson, Jr. as governor of Virginia.

Harrison was seven years old when his grandfather was elected U.S. president, but he did not attend the inauguration. His family was distinguished, but his parents were not wealthy. John Scott Harrison, a two-term U.S. congressman from Ohio, spent much of his farm income on his children's education. Despite the family's modest resources, Harrison's boyhood was enjoyable, much of it spent outdoors fishing or hunting.

Harrison's early schooling took place in a log cabin near his home, but his parents later arranged for a tutor to help him with college preparatory studies. Fourteen-year-old Benjamin and his older brother, Irwin, enrolled in Farmer's College near Cincinnati, Ohio, in 1847. He attended the college for two years and while there met his future wife, Caroline "Carrie" Lavinia Scott, a daughter of John Witherspoon Scott, the school's science professor, who was also a Presbyterian minister.

Harrison transferred to Miami University in Oxford, Ohio, in 1850, and graduated in 1852. He joined the Phi Delta Theta fraternity, which he used as a network for much of his life. He was also a member of Delta Chi, a law fraternity that permitted dual membership. Classmates included John Alexander Anderson, who became a six-term U.S. congressman, and Whitelaw Reid, Harrison's vice presidential running mate in 1892. At Miami, Harrison was strongly influenced by history and political economy professor Robert Hamilton Bishop. He also joined a Presbyterian church at college and, like his mother, became a lifelong Presbyterian.

Marriage and early career

After his college graduation in 1852, Harrison studied law with Judge Bellamy Storer of Cincinnati, but before he completed his studies, he returned to Oxford, Ohio, to marry Caroline Scott on October 20, 1853. Caroline's father, a Presbyterian minister, performed the ceremony. The Harrisons had two children, Russell Benjamin Harrison (August 12, 1854 – December 13, 1936) and Mary "Mamie" Scott Harrison (April 3, 1858 – October 28, 1930).

Harrison and his wife returned to live at The Point, his father's farm in southwestern Ohio, while he finished his law studies. Harrison was admitted to the Ohio bar in early 1854, the same year he sold property that he had inherited after the death of an aunt for $800, and used the funds to move with Caroline to Indianapolis, Indiana. Harrison began practicing law in the office of John H. Ray in 1854 and became a crier for the federal court in Indianapolis, for which he was paid $2.50 per day. He also served as a Commissioner for the U.S. Court of Claims. Harrison became a founding member and first president of both the University Club, a private gentlemen's club in Indianapolis, and the Phi Delta Theta Alumni Club. Harrison and his wife became members and assumed leadership positions at Indianapolis's First Presbyterian Church.

Having grown up in a Whig household, Harrison initially favored that party's politics, but joined the Republican Party shortly after its formation in 1856 and campaigned on behalf of Republican presidential candidate John C. Frémont. In 1857 Harrison was elected Indianapolis city attorney, a position that paid an annual salary of $400.

In 1858, Harrison entered into a law partnership with William Wallace to form the law office of Wallace and Harrison. In 1860, he was elected reporter of the Indiana Supreme Court. Harrison was an active supporter of the Republican Party's platform and served as Republican State Committee's secretary. After Wallace, his law partner, was elected county clerk in 1860, Harrison established a new firm with William Fishback, Fishback and Harrison. The new partners worked together until Harrison entered the Union Army after the start of the American Civil War.

Civil War

In 1862, President Abraham Lincoln issued a call for more recruits for the Union Army; Harrison wanted to enlist, but worried about how to support his young family. While visiting Governor Oliver Morton, Harrison found him distressed over the shortage of men answering the latest call. Harrison told the governor, "If I can be of any service, I will go."

Morton asked Harrison if he could help recruit a regiment, although he would not ask him to serve. Harrison recruited throughout northern Indiana to raise a regiment. Morton offered him the command, but Harrison declined, as he had no military experience. He was initially commissioned as a captain and company commander on July 22, 1862. Morton commissioned Harrison as a colonel on August 7, 1862, and the newly formed 70th Indiana was mustered into federal service on August 12, 1862. Once mustered, the regiment left Indiana to join the Union Army at Louisville, Kentucky.

Atlanta campaign 
For much of its first two years, the 70th Indiana performed reconnaissance duty and guarded railroads in Kentucky and Tennessee. In May 1864, Harrison and his regiment joined General William T. Sherman's Atlanta Campaign in the Army of the Cumberland and moved to the front lines. On January 2, 1864, Harrison was promoted to command the 1st Brigade of the 1st Division of the XX Corps. He commanded the brigade at the battles of Resaca, Cassville, New Hope Church, Lost Mountain, Kennesaw Mountain, Marietta, Peachtree Creek, and Atlanta. When Sherman's main force began its March to the Sea, Harrison's brigade was transferred to the District of Etowah and participated in the Battle of Nashville. While encamped near Nashville, during a particularly cold winter, Harrison prepared coffee and brought it to his freezing men at night; his constant catchphrase as he took lead of his men was: "Come on, boys!" Harrison earned a reputation as a strong leader and as an officer who did not abandon his soldiers in battle.

Resaca 
  
At the Battle of Resaca on May 15, 1864, Harrison faced Confederate Captain Max Van Den Corput’s artillery battery, which occupied a position "some eighty yards in front of the main Confederate lines". Sherman, renewing his assault on the center of the Confederate lines begun the previous day, was halted by Corput's four-gun, parapet-protected artillery battery; the battery was well placed to bedevil the Union ranks, and became "the center of a furious struggle". Corput's artillery redoubt was highly fortified "with three infantry regiments in...rifle pits and four more regiments in the main trenches". Harrison, leading the 70th Indiana Infantry Regiment, massed his troops in a ravine opposite Corput's position, along with the rest of Brigadier General Ward’s brigade. Harrison and his regiment, leading the assault, then emerged from the ravine, advanced over the artillery parapet, overcame the Confederate gunners, and eliminated the threat. The battery was captured by hand-to-hand combat, and intense combat continued throughout the afternoon. Harrison's unit, now exposed, found itself immediately subjected to intense gunfire from the main Confederate ranks and was forced to take cover. Although no longer in Confederate hands, Corput's four 121-pound Napoleon Cannons sat in a "no man's land" for the rest of the day until nightfall, when Union soldiers "dug through the parapet, slipped ropes around the four cannons, and dragged them back to [their] lines".

Peachtree Creek 
During the Battle of Peachtree Creek, on July 20, 1864, Harrison commanded his brigade against General W. S. Featherston's Mississippi Brigade, stopping the latter's "fierce assault" over Collier Road. At Peachtree Creek, Harrison's brigade comprised the 102nd, 105th, and 129th Illinois Infantry Regiments, the 79th Ohio Infantry Regiment, and his 70th Indiana Regiment; his brigade deployed in about the center of the Union line, engaging Maj. Gen. William Wing Loring’s Mississippi division and Alabama troops from General Alexander Stewart's corps. In his report after the battle Harrison wrote how "at one time during the fight," after his ammunition was dangerously depleted, he sent his acting assistant inspector-general Captain Scott and others to cut "cartridge-boxes from the rebel dead within our lines" and distribute them to his soldiers. According to Harrison's report, the losses from his brigade were "very slight" compared with those of Confederate forces; he thought this was because of battlefield topography, writing: "I believe, that the enemy, having the higher ground, fired too high." Harrison later supported the creation of an Atlanta National Military Park which would have included "substantial portions" of the Peachtree battlefield, writing in 1900: "The military incidents connected with the investment and ultimate capture of Atlanta are certainly worthy of commemoration and I should be glad to see the project succeed."

Surrender of Atlanta and promotion 
After the conclusion of the Atlanta Campaign on September 2, 1864, Harrison was among the initial Union forces to enter the surrendered city of Atlanta; General Sherman opined that Harrison served with "foresight, discipline and a fighting spirit". Following the Atlanta Campaign, Harrison reported to Governor Morton in Indiana for special duty, and while there he campaigned for the position of Indiana’s Supreme Court Reporter and for President Lincoln's reelection; after the election he left for Georgia to join Sherman's March to the Sea, but instead was "given command of the 1st Brigade at Nashville."  Harrison led the brigade at the Battle of Nashville in December, in a "decisive" action against the forces of General John Bell Hood. Notwithstanding his memorable military achievements and the praise he received for them, Harrison held a dim view of war; according to historian Allan B. Spetter he thought "war was a dirty business that no decent man would find pleasurable." Later in 1888, the year he won the presidency, Harrison declared: "We Americans have no commission from God to police the world."

Several weeks after the Battle of Nashville, Harrison "received orders to rejoin the 70th Indiana at Savannah, Georgia, after a brief furlough in Indianapolis"; however he caught scarlet fever and was delayed for a month, and then spent "several months training replacement troops in South Carolina."  

On January 23, 1865, Lincoln nominated Harrison to the grade of brevet brigadier general of volunteers, to rank from that date, and the Senate confirmed the nomination on February 14, 1865. Harrison was promoted because of his success at the battles of Resaca and Peachtree Creek. Harrison finally returned to his old regiment the same day that news of President Lincoln’s assassination was received. He rode in the Grand Review in Washington, D.C. before mustering out with the 70th Indiana on June 8, 1865.

Post-war career

Indiana politics
While serving in the Union Army in October 1864, Harrison was once again elected reporter of the Indiana Supreme Court, although he did not seek the position, and served as the Court's reporter for four more years. The position was not a politically powerful one, but it provided Harrison with a steady income for his work preparing and publishing court opinions, which he sold to the legal profession. Harrison also resumed his law practice in Indianapolis. He became a skilled orator and known as "one of the state's leading lawyers".

In 1869 President Ulysses S. Grant appointed Harrison to represent the federal government in a civil suit filed by Lambdin P. Milligan, whose controversial wartime conviction for treason in 1864 led to the landmark U.S. Supreme Court case Ex parte Milligan. The civil case was referred to the U.S. Circuit Court for Indiana at Indianapolis, where it evolved into Milligan v. Hovey. Although the jury found in Milligan's favor and he had sought hundreds of thousands of dollars in damages, state and federal statutes limited the amount the federal government had to award to Milligan to five dollars plus court costs.

With his increasing reputation, local Republicans urged Harrison to run for Congress. He initially confined his political activities to speaking on behalf of other Republican candidates, a task for which he received high praise from his colleagues. In 1872, Harrison campaigned for the Republican nomination for governor of Indiana. Former governor Oliver Morton favored his opponent, Thomas M. Browne, and Harrison lost his bid for statewide office. He returned to his law practice and, despite the Panic of 1873, was financially successful enough to build a grand new home in Indianapolis in 1874. He continued to make speeches on behalf of Republican candidates and policies.

In 1876, when a scandal forced the original Republican nominee, Godlove Stein Orth, to drop out of the gubernatorial race, Harrison accepted the party's invitation to take his place on the ticket. Harrison centered his campaign on economic policy and favored deflating the national currency. He was defeated in a plurality by James D. Williams, losing by 5,084 votes out 434,457 cast, but Harrison built on his new prominence in state politics. When the Great Railroad Strike of 1877 reached Indianapolis, he gathered a citizen militia to make a show of support for owners and management, and helped to mediate an agreement between the workers and management and to prevent the strike from widening.

When United States Senator Morton died in 1877, the Republicans nominated Harrison to run for the seat, but the party failed to gain a majority in the state legislature, which at that time elected senators; the Democratic majority elected Daniel W. Voorhees instead. In 1879, President Rutherford B. Hayes appointed Harrison to the Mississippi River Commission, which worked to develop internal improvements on the river. As a delegate to the 1880 Republican National Convention the following year, he was instrumental in breaking a deadlock on candidates, and James A. Garfield won the nomination.

U.S. Senator from Indiana

After Harrison led Indiana's Republican delegation at the 1880 Republican National Convention, he was considered the state's presumptive candidate for the U.S. Senate. He gave speeches in favor of Garfield in Indiana and New York, further raising his profile in the party. When the Republicans retook the majority in the state legislature, Harrison's election to a six-year term in the U.S. Senate was threatened by Judge Walter Q. Gresham, his intraparty rival, but Harrison was ultimately chosen. After Garfield's election as president in 1880, his administration offered Harrison a cabinet position, but Harrison declined in favor of continuing his service in the U.S. Senate.

Harrison served in the Senate from March 4, 1881, to March 3, 1887, and chaired the U.S. Senate Committee on Transportation Routes to the Seaboard (47th Congress) and the U.S. Senate Committee on Territories (48th and 49th Congresses).

In 1881, the major issue confronting Senator Harrison was the budget surplus. Democrats wanted to reduce the tariff and limit the amount of money the government took in; Republicans instead wanted to spend the money on internal improvements and pensions for Civil War veterans. Harrison took his party's side and advocated for generous pensions for veterans and their widows. He also unsuccessfully supported aid for the education of Southerners, especially children of the freedmen; he believed that education was necessary to help the black population rise to political and economic equality with whites. Harrison opposed the Chinese Exclusion Act of 1882, which his party supported, because he thought it violated existing treaties with China.

In 1884, Harrison and Gresham competed for influence at the 1884 Republican National Convention; the delegation ended up supporting Senator James G. Blaine, the eventual nominee. During the Mugwump rebellion led by reform Republicans against Blaine's candidacy, Harrison at first stood aloof, "refusing to put his hat in the presidential ring," but after walking the middle ground he eventually supported Blaine "with energy and enthusiasm." In the Senate, Harrison achieved passage of his Dependent Pension Bill, only to see it vetoed by President Grover Cleveland. His efforts to further the admission of new western states were stymied by Democrats, who feared that the new states would elect Republicans to Congress. 

In 1885 the Democrats redistricted the Indiana state legislature, which resulted in an increased Democratic majority in 1886, despite an overall Republican majority statewide. In 1887, largely as a result of the Democratic gerrymandering of Indiana's legislative districts, Harrison was defeated in his bid for reelection. Following a deadlock in the state senate, the state legislature eventually chose Democrat David Turpie as Harrison's successor in the Senate. Harrison returned to Indianapolis and resumed his law practice, but stayed active in state and national politics. A year after his senatorial defeat, Harrison declared his candidacy for the Republican nomination; he dubbed himself a "living and rejuvenated Republican," a reference to his lack of a power base. Thereafter, the phrase "'Rejuvenated Republicanism' became the slogan of his presidential campaign."

Election of 1888

Nomination for president

The initial favorite for the Republican nomination was the previous nominee, James G. Blaine of Maine. After his narrow defeat against Cleveland in 1884 Blaine became the front-runner for 1888, but decided to remove his name from contention. After Blaine wrote several letters denying any interest in the nomination, his supporters divided among other candidates, with Senator John Sherman of Ohio as the leader among them. Others, including Chauncey Depew of New York, Russell Alger of Michigan, and Harrison's old nemesis Walter Q. Gresham—now a federal appellate court judge in Chicago—also sought the delegates' support at the 1888 Republican National Convention. Harrison "marshaled his troops" to stop Gresham from gaining control of the Indiana delegation while simultaneously presenting himself "as an attractive alternative to Blaine." Blaine did not publicly endorse any of the candidates, but on March 1, 1888, he privately wrote that "the one man remaining who in my judgment can make the best one is Benjamin Harrison." Later at the National Convention, which took place in June, Blaine "threw his support to Harrison in the hope of uniting the party" against President Cleveland; nonetheless, the nomination fight that followed was "hotly contested."

The convention opened on June 19 at the Auditorium Building in Chicago, Illinois. Proceedings began with an announcement of the party platform; Lincoln was extolled as the "first great leader" of the Republican Party and an "immortal champion of liberty and the rights of the people." Republican presidents Grant, Garfield, and Arthur were likewise acknowledged with "remembrance and gratitude." The "fundamental idea of the Republican party" was declared to be "hostility to all forms of despotism and oppression," and the Brazilian people were congratulated for their recent abolition of slavery. The convention alleged that the "present Administration and the Democratic majority in Congress owe their existence to the suppression of the ballot by a criminal nullification of the Constitution." Anticipating a principal part of Harrison's campaign, the convention also declared itself "uncompromisingly in favor of the American system of protection," and protested "against its destruction as proposed by the President and his party." The tariff was later to become the "main issue of the campaign" in 1888. The admission of six new states during Harrison's term, between 1889 and 1890, was anticipated with the declaration: "whenever the conditions of population, material resources...and morality are such as to insure a stable local government," the people "should be permitted...to form for themselves constitutions and State government, and be admitted into the Union." The convention insisted that "The pending bills in the Senate to enable the people of Washington, North Dakota and Montana Territories to...establish State governments, should be passed without unnecessary delay." The convention began with seventeen candidates for the nomination.

Harrison placed fifth on the first ballot, with Senator Sherman in the lead, and the next few ballots showed little change. As the convention moved forward, Harrison became "everyone's second choice in a field of seven candidates." Then, after Sherman "faltered in the balloting," Harrison gained support. Blaine supporters shifted their support among candidates they found acceptable, and when they shifted to Harrison, they found a candidate who could attract the votes of many other delegations. Intending to make it undeniably clear he would not be a candidate, Blaine left the country and was staying with Andrew Carnegie in Scotland when the National Convention began, not returning to the United States until August; the delegates finally accepted Blaine's refusal to be nominated. After New York switched to Harrison's column, he gained the needed momentum for victory. Harrison was nominated as the party's presidential candidate on the eighth ballot, by a count of 544 to 108 votes. Levi P. Morton of New York—a banker, former U.S. Minister to France, and former U.S. congressman—was chosen as his running mate. At their National Convention in St. Louis, Democrats rallied behind President Cleveland and his running-mate, Senator Allen G. Thurman from Ohio; Vice President Hendricks had died in office on November 25, 1885. After returning to America, Blaine visited Harrison at his home in October.

Campaign against Cleveland

Harrison's opponent in the general election was incumbent President Grover Cleveland. Harrison reprised a more traditional front-porch campaign, abandoned by his immediate predecessors; he received visiting delegations to Indianapolis and made over 90 pronouncements from his hometown. The Republicans campaigned heavily in favor of protective tariffs, turning out protectionist voters in the important industrial states of the North. The election took place on Tuesday, November 6, 1888; it focused on the swing states of New York, New Jersey, Connecticut, and Harrison's home state of Indiana. Harrison and Cleveland split the four, with Harrison winning New York and Indiana. Voter turnout was 79.3%, reflecting large interest in the campaign; nearly eleven million votes were cast. Harrison received 90,000 fewer popular votes than Cleveland, but carried the Electoral College 233 to 168. Allegations were made against Republicans for engaging in irregular ballot practices; an example was described as Blocks of Five. On October 31 the Indiana Sentinel published a letter allegedly by Harrison's friend and supporter, William Wade Dudley, offering to bribe voters in "blocks of five" to ensure Harrison's election. Harrison neither defended nor repudiated Dudley, but allowed him to remain on the campaign for the remaining few days. After the election, Harrison never spoke to Dudley again.

Harrison had made no political bargains, but his supporters had made many pledges on his behalf. When Boss Matthew Quay of Pennsylvania, who was rebuffed for a Cabinet position for his political support during the convention, heard that Harrison ascribed his narrow victory to Providence, Quay exclaimed that Harrison would never know "how close a number of men were compelled to approach...the penitentiary to make him president". Harrison was known as the Centennial President because his inauguration celebrated the centenary of the first inauguration of George Washington in 1789. In the congressional elections, Republicans increased their membership in the House of Representatives by 19 seats.

Presidency (1889–1893)

Inauguration and cabinet

Harrison was sworn into office on Monday, March 4, 1889, by Chief Justice Melville Fuller. His speech was brief—half as long as that of his grandfather, William Henry Harrison, whose speech remains the longest inaugural address of a U.S. president. In his speech, Benjamin Harrison credited the nation's growth to the influences of education and religion, urged the cotton states and mining territories to attain the industrial proportions of the eastern states and promised a protective tariff. Of commerce, he said, "If our great corporations would more scrupulously observe their legal obligations and duties, they would have less call to complain of the limitations of their rights or of interference with their operations." Harrison also urged early statehood for the territories and advocated pensions for veterans, a call that met with enthusiastic applause. In foreign affairs, Harrison reaffirmed the Monroe Doctrine as a mainstay of foreign policy, while urging modernization of the Navy and a merchant marine force. He gave his commitment to international peace through noninterference in the affairs of foreign governments.

John Philip Sousa's Marine Corps band played at the Inaugural Ball inside the Pension Building with a large crowd attending. After moving into the White House, Harrison noted, quite prophetically, "There is only a door—one that is never locked—between the president's office and what are not very accurately called his private apartments. There should be an executive office building, not too far away, but wholly distinct from the dwelling house. For everyone else in the public service, there is an unroofed space between the bedroom and the desk."

Harrison acted quite independently in selecting his cabinet, much to the Republican bosses' dismay. He began by delaying the presumed nomination of James G. Blaine as Secretary of State so as to preclude Blaine's involvement in the formation of the administration, as had occurred in President Garfield's term. In fact, other than Blaine, the only Republican boss initially nominated was Redfield Proctor, as Secretary of War. Senator Shelby Cullom's comment symbolizes Harrison's steadfast aversion to use federal positions for patronage: "I suppose Harrison treated me as well as he did any other Senator; but whenever he did anything for me, it was done so ungraciously that the concession tended to anger rather than please." Harrison's selections shared particular alliances, such as their service in the Civil War, Indiana citizenship and membership in the Presbyterian Church. Nevertheless, Harrison had alienated pivotal Republican operatives from New York to Pennsylvania to Iowa with these choices and prematurely compromised his political power and future. His normal schedule provided for two full cabinet meetings per week, as well as separate weekly one-on-one meetings with each cabinet member.

In June 1890, Harrison's Postmaster General John Wanamaker and several Philadelphia friends purchased a large new cottage at Cape May Point for Harrison's wife, Caroline. Many believed the cottage gift appeared improper and amounted to a bribe for a cabinet position. Harrison made no comment on the matter for two weeks, then said he had always intended to purchase the cottage once Caroline approved. On July 2, perhaps a little tardily to avoid suspicion, Harrison gave Wanamaker a check for $10,000 for the cottage.

Civil service reform and pensions

Civil service reform was a prominent issue following Harrison's election. Harrison had campaigned as a supporter of the merit system, as opposed to the spoils system. Although some of the civil service had been classified under the Pendleton Act by previous administrations, Harrison spent much of his first months in office deciding on political appointments. Congress was widely divided on the issue and Harrison was reluctant to address the issue in hope of preventing the alienation of either side. The issue became a political football of the time and was immortalized in a cartoon captioned "What can I do when both parties insist on kicking?" Harrison appointed Theodore Roosevelt and Hugh Smith Thompson, both reformers, to the Civil Service Commission, but otherwise did little to further the reform cause.

Harrison quickly saw the enactment of the Dependent and Disability Pension Act in 1890, a cause he had championed while in Congress. In addition to providing pensions to disabled Civil War veterans (regardless of the cause of their disability), the Act depleted some of the troublesome federal budget surplus. Pension expenditures reached $135 million under Harrison (equivalent to $ billion in ), the largest expenditure of its kind to that point in American history, a problem exacerbated by Pension Bureau commissioner James R. Tanner's expansive interpretation of the pension laws. An investigation into the Pension Bureau by Harrison's Secretary of Interior John Willock Noble found evidence of lavish and illegal handouts under Tanner. Harrison, who privately believed that appointing Tanner had been a mistake, due to his apparent loose management style and tongue, asked Tanner to resign and replaced him with Green B. Raum. Raum was also accused of accepting loan payments in return for expediting pension cases. Harrison, having accepted a dissenting congressional Republican investigation report that exonerated Raum, kept him in office for the rest of his administration.

One of the first appointments Harrison was forced to reverse was that of James S. Clarkson as an assistant postmaster. Clarkson, who had expected a full cabinet position, began sabotaging the appointment from the outset, gaining the reputation for "decapitating a fourth class postmaster every three minutes". Clarkson himself stated, "I am simply on detail from the Republican Committee ... I am most anxious to get through this task and leave." He resigned in September 1890.

Tariff

The tariff levels had been a major political issue since before the Civil War, and they became the most dominant matter of the 1888 election. The high tariff rates had created a surplus of money in the Treasury, which led many Democrats (as well as the growing Populist movement) to call for lowering them. Most Republicans preferred to maintain the rates, spend the surplus on internal improvements and eliminate some internal taxes.

Representative William McKinley and Senator Nelson W. Aldrich framed the McKinley Tariff that would raise the tariff even higher, including making some rates intentionally prohibitive. At Secretary of State James Blaine's urging, Harrison attempted to make the tariff more acceptable by urging Congress to add reciprocity provisions, which would allow the president to reduce rates when other countries reduced their rates on American exports. The tariff was removed from imported raw sugar, and sugar growers in the United States were given a two cent per pound subsidy on their production. Even with the reductions and reciprocity, the McKinley Tariff enacted the highest average rate in American history, and the spending associated with it contributed to the reputation of the Billion-Dollar Congress.

Antitrust laws and the currency

Members of both parties were concerned with the growth of the power of trusts and monopolies, and one of the first acts of the 51st Congress was to pass the Sherman Antitrust Act, sponsored by Senator John Sherman of Ohio. The Act passed by wide margins in both houses, and Harrison signed it into law. The Sherman Act was the first Federal act of its kind, and marked a new use of federal government power. While Harrison approved of the law and its intent, his administration was not particularly vigorous in enforcing it. However, the government successfully concluded a case during Harrison's time in office (against a Tennessee coal company), and had initiated several other cases against trusts.

One of the most volatile questions of the 1880s was whether the currency should be backed by gold and silver, or by gold alone. The issue cut across party lines, with western Republicans and southern Democrats joining together in the call for the free coinage of silver, and both parties' representatives in the northeast holding firm for the gold standard. Because silver was worth less than its legal equivalent in gold, taxpayers paid their government bills in silver, while international creditors demanded payment in gold, resulting in a depletion of the nation's gold supply. Owing to worldwide deflation in the late 19th century, however, a strict gold standard had resulted in reduction of incomes without the equivalent reduction in debts, pushing debtors and the poor to call for silver coinage as an inflationary measure.

The silver coinage issue had not been much discussed in the 1888 campaign and Harrison is said to have favored a bimetallist position. However, his appointment of a silverite Treasury Secretary, William Windom, encouraged the free silver supporters. Harrison attempted to steer a middle course between the two positions, advocating a free coinage of silver, but at its own value, not at a fixed ratio to gold. This failed to facilitate a compromise between the factions. In July 1890, Senator Sherman achieved passage of a bill, the Sherman Silver Purchase Act, in both houses. Harrison thought that the bill would end the controversy, and he signed it into law. The effect of the bill, however, was the increased depletion of the nation's gold supply, a problem that would persist until the second Cleveland administration resolved it.

Civil rights

After regaining the majority in both Houses of Congress, some Republicans, led by Harrison, attempted to pass legislation to protect black Americans' civil rights. Harrison's Attorney General, William H. H. Miller, through the Justice Department, ordered the prosecutions for violation of voting rights in the South; however, white juries often failed to convict or indict violators. This prompted Harrison to urge Congress to pass legislation that would "secure all our people a free exercise of the right of suffrage and every other civil right under the Constitution and laws". Harrison endorsed the proposed Federal Elections Bill written by Representative Henry Cabot Lodge and Senator George Frisbie Hoar in 1890, but the bill was defeated in the Senate. Following the failure to pass the bill, Harrison continued to speak in favor of African American civil rights in addresses to Congress. Most notably, on December 3, 1889, Harrison had gone before Congress and stated:

The colored people did not intrude themselves upon us; they were brought here in chains and held in communities where they are now chiefly bound by a cruel slave code...when and under what conditions is the black man to have a free ballot? When is he in fact to have those full civil rights which have so long been his in law? When is that quality of influence which our form of government was intended to secure to the electors to be restored? … in many parts of our country where the colored population is large the people of that race are by various devices deprived of any effective exercise of their political rights and of many of their civil rights. The wrong does not expend itself upon those whose votes are suppressed. Every constituency in the Union is wronged.

He severely questioned the states' civil rights records, arguing that if states have the authority over civil rights, then "we have a right to ask whether they are at work upon it." Harrison also supported a bill proposed by Senator Henry W. Blair, which would have granted federal funding to schools regardless of the students' races. He also endorsed a proposed constitutional amendment to overturn the Supreme Court ruling in the Civil Rights Cases (1883) that declared much of the Civil Rights Act of 1875 unconstitutional. None of these measures gained congressional approval.

National forests
In March 1891 Congress enacted, and Harrison signed, the Land Revision Act of 1891. This legislation resulted from a bipartisan desire to initiate reclamation of surplus lands that had been, up to that point, granted from the public domain, for potential settlement or use by railroad syndicates. As the law's drafting was finalized, Section 24 was added at the behest of Harrison by his Secretary of the Interior John Noble, which read as follows:
That the President of the United States may, from time to time, set apart and reserve, in any State or Territory having public land bearing forests, in any part of the public lands wholly or in part covered with timber or undergrowth, whether of commercial value or not, as public reservations, and the president shall, by public proclamation, declare the establishment of such reservations and the limits thereof.

Within a month of the enactment of this law Harrison authorized the first forest reserve, to be located on public domain adjacent to Yellowstone National Park, in Wyoming. Other areas were so designated by Harrison, bringing the first forest reservations total to 22 million acres in his term. Harrison was also the first to give a prehistoric Indian Ruin, Casa Grande in Arizona, federal protection.

Native American policy
During Harrison's administration, the Lakota Sioux, previously confined to reservations in South Dakota, grew restive under the influence of Wovoka, a medicine man, who encouraged them to participate in a spiritual movement called the Ghost Dance. Many in Washington did not understand the predominantly religious nature of the Ghost Dance, and thought it was a militant movement being used to rally Native Americans against the government. On December 29, 1890, troops from the Seventh Cavalry clashed with the Sioux at Wounded Knee. The result was a massacre of at least 146 Sioux, including many women and children; the dead Sioux were buried in a mass grave. In reaction Harrison directed Major General Nelson A. Miles to investigate and ordered 3,500 federal troops to South Dakota; the uprising was brought to an end. Wounded Knee is considered the last major American Indian battle in the 19th century. Harrison's general policy on American Indians was to encourage assimilation into white society and, despite the massacre, he believed the policy to have been generally successful. This policy, known as the allotment system and embodied in the Dawes Act, was favored by liberal reformers at the time, but eventually proved detrimental to American Indians as they sold most of their land at low prices to white speculators.

Technology and naval modernization

During Harrison's time in office, the United States was continuing to experience advances in science and technology. A recording of his voice is the earliest extant recording of a president while he was in office. That  was originally made on a wax phonograph cylinder in 1889 by Gianni Bettini. Harrison also had electricity installed in the White House for the first time by Edison General Electric Company, but he and his wife would not touch the light switches for fear of electrocution and would often go to sleep with the lights on.

Over the course of his administration, Harrison marshaled the country's technology to clothe the nation with a credible naval power. When he took office there were only two commissioned warships in the Navy. In his inaugural address he said, "construction of a sufficient number of warships and their necessary armaments should progress as rapidly as is consistent with care and perfection." By 1898, with the help of the Carnegie Corporation, no less than ten modern warships, including steel hulls and greater displacements and armaments, had transformed the United States into a legitimate naval power. Seven of these had begun during the Harrison term.

Foreign policy

Latin America and Samoa
Harrison and Secretary of State Blaine were often not the most cordial of friends, but harmonized in an aggressive foreign policy and commercial reciprocity with other nations. Blaine's persistent medical problems warranted more of a hands-on effort by Harrison in the conduct of foreign policy. In San Francisco, while on tour of the United States in 1891, Harrison proclaimed that the United States was in a "new epoch" of trade and that the expanding navy would protect oceanic shipping and increase American influence and prestige abroad. The First International Conference of American States met in Washington in 1889; Harrison set an aggressive agenda including customs and currency integration and named a bipartisan delegation to the conference, led by John B. Henderson and Andrew Carnegie. The conference failed to achieve any diplomatic breakthrough, due in large part to an atmosphere of suspicion fostered by the Argentinian delegation. It did succeed in establishing an information center that became the Pan American Union. In response to the diplomatic bust, Harrison and Blaine pivoted diplomatically and initiated a crusade for tariff reciprocity with Latin American nations; the Harrison administration concluded eight reciprocity treaties among these countries. On another front, Harrison sent Frederick Douglass as ambassador to Haiti, but failed in his attempts to establish a naval base there.

In 1889, the United States, the United Kingdom, and the German Empire were locked in a dispute over control of the Samoan Islands. Historian George H. Ryden's research indicates Harrison played a key role in determining the status of this Pacific outpost by taking a firm stand on every aspect of Samoa conference negotiations; this included selection of the local ruler, refusal to allow an indemnity for Germany, as well as the establishment of a three power protectorate, a first for the U.S.. These arrangements facilitated the future dominant power of the U.S. in the Pacific; Secretary of State Blaine was absent due to complication of lumbago.

European embargo of U.S. pork
Throughout the 1880s various European countries had imposed a ban on importation of United States pork out of an unconfirmed concern of trichinosis; at issue was over one billion pounds of pork products with a value of $80 million annually (equivalent to $ billion in ). Harrison engaged Whitelaw Reid, minister to France, and William Walter Phelps, minister to Germany, to restore these exports for the country without delay. Harrison also successfully asked the congress to enact the Meat Inspection Act to eliminate the accusations of product compromise. The president also partnered with Agriculture Secretary Rusk to threaten Germany with retaliation – by initiating an embargo in the U.S. against Germany's highly demanded beet sugar. By September 1891 Germany relented, and was soon followed by Denmark, France and Austria-Hungary.

Crises in Aleutian Islands and Chile
The first international crisis Harrison faced arose from disputed fishing rights on the Alaskan coast. Canada claimed fishing and sealing rights around many of the Aleutian Islands, in violation of U.S. law. As a result, the United States Navy seized several Canadian ships. In 1891, the administration began negotiations with the British that would eventually lead to a compromise over fishing rights after international arbitration, with the British government paying compensation in 1898.

In 1891, a diplomatic crisis emerged in Chile, otherwise known as the Baltimore Crisis. The American minister to Chile, Patrick Egan, granted asylum to Chileans who were seeking refuge during the 1891 Chilean Civil War. Egan, previously a militant Irish immigrant to the U.S., was motivated by a personal desire to thwart Great Britain's influence in Chile; his action increased tensions between Chile and the United States, which began in the early 1880s when Secretary Blaine had alienated the Chileans in the War of the Pacific.

The crisis began in earnest when sailors from  took shore leave in Valparaiso and a fight ensued, resulting in the deaths of two American sailors and the arrest of three dozen others. Baltimores captain, Winfield Schley, based on the nature of the sailors' wounds, insisted the sailors had been bayonet-attacked by Chilean police without provocation. With Blaine incapacitated, Harrison drafted a demand for reparations. The Chilean Minister of Foreign Affairs Manuel Matta replied that Harrison's message was "erroneous or deliberately incorrect," and said that the Chilean government was treating the affair the same as any other criminal matter.

Tensions increased to the brink of war – Harrison threatened to break off diplomatic relations unless the United States received a suitable apology, and said the situation required, "grave and patriotic consideration". The president also remarked, "If the dignity as well as the prestige and influence of the United States are not to be wholly sacrificed, we must protect those who in foreign ports display the flag or wear the colors." The Navy was also placed on a high level of preparedness. A recuperated Blaine made brief conciliatory overtures to the Chilean government which had no support in the administration; he then reversed course, joined the chorus for unconditional concessions and apology by the Chileans, who ultimately obliged, and war was averted. Theodore Roosevelt later applauded Harrison for his use of the "big stick" in the matter.

Annexation of Hawaii
In the last days of his administration, Harrison dealt with the issue of Hawaiian annexation. Following a coup d'état against Queen Liliuokalani, the new government of Hawaii led by Sanford Dole petitioned for annexation by the United States. Harrison was interested in expanding American influence in Hawaii and in establishing a naval base at Pearl Harbor but had not previously expressed an opinion on annexing the islands. The United States consul in Hawaii, John L. Stevens, recognized the new government on February 1, 1893, and forwarded their proposals to Washington. With just one month left before leaving office, the administration signed a treaty on February 14 and submitted it to the Senate the next day with Harrison's recommendation. The Senate failed to act, and President Cleveland withdrew the treaty shortly after taking office.

Cabinet

Judicial appointments

Harrison appointed four justices to the Supreme Court of the United States. The first was David Josiah Brewer, a judge on the Court of Appeals for the Eighth Circuit. Brewer, the nephew of Justice Field, had previously been considered for a cabinet position. Shortly after Brewer's nomination, Justice Matthews died, creating another vacancy. Harrison had considered Henry Billings Brown, a Michigan judge and admiralty law expert, for the first vacancy and now nominated him for the second. For the third vacancy, which arose in 1892, Harrison nominated George Shiras. Shiras's appointment was somewhat controversial because his age—sixty—was older than usual for a newly appointed Justice. Shiras also drew the opposition of Senator Matthew Quay of Pennsylvania because they were in different factions of the Pennsylvania Republican party, but his nomination was nonetheless approved. Finally, at the end of his term, Harrison nominated Howell Edmunds Jackson to replace Justice Lamar, who died in January 1893. Harrison knew the incoming Senate would be controlled by Democrats, so he selected Jackson, a respected Tennessee Democrat with whom he was friendly to ensure his nominee would not be rejected. Jackson's nomination was indeed successful, but he died after only two years on the Court.

In addition to his Supreme Court appointments, Harrison appointed ten judges to the courts of appeals, two judges to the circuit courts, and 26 judges to the district courts.

States admitted to the Union
Six new states were admitted to the Union while Harrison was in office:
 North DakotaNovember 2, 1889
 South DakotaNovember 2, 1889
 MontanaNovember 8, 1889
 WashingtonNovember 11, 1889
 IdahoJuly 3, 1890
 WyomingJuly 10, 1890
More states were admitted during Harrison's presidency than any other.

Vacations and travel
Harrison attended a grand, three-day centennial celebration of George Washington's inauguration in New York City on April 30, 1889, and made the following remarks "We have come into the serious but always inspiring presence of Washington. He was the incarnation of duty and he teaches us today this great lesson: that those who would associate their names with events that shall outlive a century can only do so by high consecration to duty. Self-seeking has no public observance or anniversary."

The Harrisons made many trips out of the capital, which included speeches at most stops – including Philadelphia, New England, Indianapolis and Chicago. The President typically made his best impression speaking before large audiences, as opposed to more intimate settings. The most notable of his presidential trips, theretofore unequaled, was a five-week tour of the west in the spring of 1891, aboard a lavishly outfitted train. Harrison enjoyed a number of short trips out of the capital—usually for hunting—to nearby Virginia or Maryland.

During the hot Washington summers, the Harrisons took refuge in Deer Park, Maryland and Cape May Point, New Jersey. In 1890, John Wanamaker joined with other Philadelphia devotees of the Harrisons and made a gift to them of a summer cottage at Cape May. Harrison, though appreciative, was uncomfortable with the appearance of impropriety; a month later, he paid Wanamaker $10,000 as reimbursement to the donors. Nevertheless, Harrison's opponents made the gift the subject of national ridicule, and Mrs. Harrison and the president were vigorously criticized.

Reelection campaign in 1892

The treasury surplus had evaporated and the nation's economic health was worsening – precursors to the eventual Panic of 1893. Congressional elections in 1890 had gone against the Republicans; and although Harrison had cooperated with congressional Republicans on legislation, several party leaders withdrew their support for him because of his adamant refusal to give party members the nod in the course of his executive appointments. Specifically, Thomas C. Platt, Matthew S. Quay, Thomas B. Reed and James Clarkson quietly organized the Grievance Committee, the ambition of which was to initiate a dump-Harrison offensive. They solicited the support of Blaine, without effect however, and Harrison in reaction resolved to run for re-election – seemingly forced to choose one of two options – "become a candidate or forever wear the name of a political coward".

It was clear that Harrison would not be re-nominated unanimously. Many of Harrison's detractors persisted in pushing for an incapacitated Blaine, though he announced that he was not a candidate in February 1892. Some party leaders still hoped to draft Blaine into running, and speculation increased when he resigned at the 11th hour as Secretary of State in June. At the convention in Minneapolis, Harrison prevailed on the first ballot, but encountered significant opposition.

The Democrats renominated former President Cleveland, making the 1892 election a rematch of the one four years earlier. The tariff revisions of the past four years had made imported goods so expensive that now many voters shifted to the reform position. Many westerners, traditionally Republican voters, defected to the new Populist Party candidate, James Weaver, who promised free silver, generous veterans' pensions, and an eight-hour work day. The effects of the suppression of the Homestead Strike rebounded against the Republicans as well, although the federal government did not take action.

Harrison's wife Caroline began a critical struggle with tuberculosis earlier in 1892, and two weeks before the election, on October 25, she died from the disease. Their daughter Mary Harrison McKee assumed the role of First Lady after her mother's death. Mrs. Harrison's terminal illness and the fact that both candidates had served in the White House called for a low key campaign, and resulted in neither of the candidates actively campaigning personally.

Cleveland ultimately won the election by 277 electoral votes to Harrison's 145, and also won the popular vote by 5,556,918 to 5,176,108; this was the most decisive presidential election in 20 years. It gave Harrison the distinction of being the only president whose predecessor and successor were the same man.

Post-presidency (1893–1901)

After he left office, Harrison visited the World's Columbian Exposition in Chicago in June 1893. After the Expo, Harrison returned to his home in Indianapolis. Harrison had been elected a companion of the Military Order of the Loyal Legion of the United States in 1882, and was elected as commander (president) of the Ohio Commandery on May 3, 1893. For a few months in 1894, Harrison lived in San Francisco, California, where he gave law lectures at Stanford University. In 1896, some of Harrison's friends in the Republican party tried to convince him to seek the presidency again, but he declined. He traveled around the nation making appearances and speeches in support of William McKinley's candidacy for president.

From July 1895 to March 1901 Harrison served on the Board of Trustees of Purdue University, where Harrison Hall, a dormitory, was named in his honor. He wrote a series of articles about the federal government and the presidency which were republished in 1897 as a book titled This Country of Ours. In 1896, Harrison at age 62 remarried, to Mary Scott Lord Dimmick, the widowed 37-year-old niece and former secretary of his deceased wife. Harrison's two adult children, Russell, 41 years old at the time, and Mary (Mamie) McKee, 38, disapproved of the marriage and did not attend the wedding. Benjamin and Mary had one child together, Elizabeth (February 21, 1897 – December 26, 1955).

In 1898, Harrison served as an attorney for the Republic of Venezuela in their British Guiana boundary dispute with the United Kingdom. An international trial was agreed upon; he filed an 800-page brief and traveled to Paris where he spent more than 25 hours in court on Venezuela's behalf. Although he lost the case, his legal arguments won him international renown. In 1899 Harrison attended the First Peace Conference at The Hague.

Harrison was an active Presbyterian and served as an Elder in the First Presbyterian Church of Indianapolis and on a special committee on creed revision in the national Presbyterian General Assembly. However, he died before he could cast his vote at the meeting.

Death

Harrison developed what was thought to be influenza (then referred to as grippe), which later proved to be pneumonia, in February 1901. He was treated with steam vapor inhalation and oxygen, but his condition worsened. Harrison died from pneumonia at his home in Indianapolis on March 13, 1901, at the age of 67. His last words were reported to be, "Are the doctors here? Doctor, my lungs...". Harrison's remains are interred in Indianapolis's Crown Hill Cemetery, next to the remains of his first wife, Caroline. After her death in 1948, Mary Dimmick Harrison, his second wife, was buried beside him.

Historical reputation and memorials

Historian Charles Calhoun gives Harrison major credit for innovative legislation in antitrust, monetary policy and tariffs. Historians have often given Secretary of State Blaine credit for foreign-policy initiatives. However, Calhoun argues that Harrison was even more responsible for the success of trade negotiations, the buildup of the steel Navy, overseas expansion, and emphasis on the American role in dominating the Western Hemisphere through the Monroe Doctrine. The major weakness which Calhoun sees was that the public and indeed the grassroots Republican Party was not fully prepared for this onslaught of major activity. The Democrats scored a sweeping landslide in 1890 by attacking the flagship legislation, especially the McKinley tariff, because it would raise the cost of living of the average American family. McKinley himself was defeated for reelection.

According to historian R. Hal Williams, Harrison had a "widespread reputation for personal and official integrity". Closely scrutinized by Democrats, Harrison's reputation was largely intact when he left the White House. Having an advantage few 19th-century presidents had, Harrison's own party, the Republicans, controlled Congress, while his administration actively advanced a Republican program of a higher tariff, moderate control of corporations, protecting African American voting rights, a generous Civil War pension, and compromising over the controversial silver issue. Historians have not raised "serious questions about Harrison's own integrity or the integrity of his administration". 

Following the Panic of 1893, Harrison became more popular in retirement. Scholars have argued that Harrison's economic policies contributed to the Panic of 1893. His legacy among historians is scant, and "general accounts of his period inaccurately treat Harrison as a cipher". More recently,

historians have recognized the importance of the Harrison administration—and Harrison himself—in the new foreign policy of the late nineteenth century. The administration faced challenges throughout the hemisphere, in the Pacific, and in relations with the European powers, involvements that would be taken for granted in the twenty first century.

Harrison's presidency belongs properly to the 19th century, but he "clearly pointed the way" to the modern presidency that would emerge under William McKinley. The bipartisan Sherman Anti-Trust Act signed into law by Harrison remains in effect over 120 years later and was the most important legislation passed by the Fifty-first Congress. Harrison's support for African American voting rights and education would be the last significant attempts to protect civil rights until the 1930s. Harrison's tenacity at foreign policy was emulated by politicians such as Theodore Roosevelt.

Harrison was memorialized on several postage stamps. The first was a 13-cent stamp issued on November 18, 1902, with the engraved likeness of Harrison modeled after a photo provided by his widow. In all Harrison has been honored on six U.S. Postage stamps, more than most other U.S. Presidents. Harrison also was featured on the five-dollar National Bank Notes from the third charter period, beginning in 1902. In 2012, a dollar coin with his image, part of the Presidential $1 Coin Program, was issued.

In 1908, the people of Indianapolis erected the Benjamin Harrison memorial statue, created by Charles Niehaus and Henry Bacon, in honor of Harrison's lifetime achievements as military leader, U.S. Senator, and President of the United States. The statue occupies a site on the south edge of University Park, facing the Birch Bayh Federal Building and United States Courthouse across New York Avenue.

In 1951, Harrison's home was opened to the public as a library and museum. It had been used as a dormitory for a music school from 1937 to 1950. The house was designated as a National Historic Landmark in 1964.

Theodore Roosevelt dedicated Fort Benjamin Harrison in the former president's honor in 1906. It is located in Lawrence, Indiana, a northeastern suburb of Indianapolis. The federal government decommissioned Fort Harrison in 1991 and transferred 1,700 of its 2,500 acres to Indiana's state government in 1995 to establish Fort Harrison State Park. The site has been redeveloped to include residential neighborhoods and a golf course.

In 1931, Franklin Hall at Miami University, Harrison's alma mater, was renamed Harrison Hall. It was replaced by a new building of the same name in 1960 and houses the college's political science department. In 1966, Purdue University opened Harrison Hall, an eight-floor, 400-room residence hall. Harrison served as a Purdue University Trustee for the last six years of his life.

See also
 List of presidents of the United States
 List of presidents of the United States by previous experience

Notes

References

Sources

Further reading

 
 Bourdon, Jeffrey Normand. "Trains, Canes, and Replica Log Cabins: Benjamin Harrison's 1888 Front-Porch Campaign for the Presidency." Indiana Magazine of History 110.3 (2014): 246–269. online
 Calhoun, Charles W. "Benjamin Harrison, Centennial President: A Review Essay." Indiana Magazine of History (1988). [ online]
 Dewey, Davis R. National Problems: 1880–1897 (1907)
 Gallagher, Douglas Steven. "The" smallest mistake": explaining the failures of the Hayes and Harrison presidencies." White House Studies 2.4 (2002): 395–414.
 Morgan, H. Wayne, From Hayes to McKinley: National Party Politics, 1877–1896 (1969)

Primary sources
 Debs, Eugene V. "General Benjamin Harrison — Relentless Foe of Labor: A Democratic Campaign Speech in Terre Haute, IN, Oct. 27, 1888," Terre Haute Weekly Gazette, November 1, 1888, section 2, pp. 1, 4.
 Harrison, Benjamin. Speeches of Benjamin Harrison, Twenty-third President of the United States (1892), compiled by Charles Hedges.

External links

Official
 Benjamin Harrison Presidential Site

Media coverage

Other
 
 Benjamin Harrison: Resource Guide, Library of Congress
 Benjamin & Caroline Scott Harrison Collection, Miami University Libraries
 Benjamin Harrison Collection, 1853–1943 , at the Indiana Historical Society
 Essay on Harrison and each member of his cabinet and First Lady, Miller Center of Public Affairs
 "Life Portrait of Benjamin Harrison", from C-SPAN's American Presidents: Life Portraits, August 20, 1999
 Recording of an 1889 Harrison speech – Vincent Voice Library, Michigan State University
 Collection of Benjamin Harrison's Personal Letters & Manuscripts
 

 Benjamin Harrison Collection, Rare Books and Manuscripts, Indiana State Library

 
1833 births
1901 deaths
19th-century presidents of the United States
1880s in the United States
1890s in the United States
American people of English descent
American people of Scotch-Irish descent
American Presbyterians
Burials at Crown Hill Cemetery
Deaths from influenza
Deaths from pneumonia in Indiana
Benjamin
Indiana lawyers
Indiana Republicans
Infectious disease deaths in Indiana
Miami University alumni
Ohio lawyers
People from Hamilton County, Ohio
Politicians from Indianapolis
People of Indiana in the American Civil War
People of Ohio in the American Civil War
Presidents of the United States
Republican Party presidents of the United States
Republican Party (United States) presidential nominees
Republican Party United States senators from Indiana
Sons of the American Revolution
Stanford Law School faculty
Union Army colonels
Candidates in the 1888 United States presidential election
Candidates in the 1892 United States presidential election
19th-century American politicians
19th-century Presbyterians
20th-century Presbyterians